Stenodactylus doriae, commonly known as Doria's comb-fingered gecko and the Middle Eastern short-fingered gecko, is a species of lizard in the family Gekkonidae. The species is native to Western Asia.

Etymology
The specific name, doriae, is in honor of Italian naturalist Giacomo Doria.

Geographic range
S. doriae occurs in Iran, Iraq, Israel, Jordan, Kuwait, Oman, Saudi Arabia, and the United Arab Emirates.

Habitat

Description
Its eyes are bordered by large scales to protect them from the sand during burrowing.

Reproduction
S. doriae is oviparous. Clutch size is one or two eggs.

References

Further reading
Blanford WT (1874). "Descriptions of new Lizards from Persia and Baluchistán". Ann. Mag. Nat. Hist., Fourth Series 13: 453–455. (Ceramodactylus doriae, new species, pp. 454–455). (in English and Latin).
Boulenger GA (1885). Catalogue of the Lizards in the British Museum (Natural History). Second Edition. Volume I. Geckonidæ ... London: Trustees of the British Museum (Natural History). (Taylor and Francis, printers). xii + 436 pp. + Plates I-XXXII. (Ceramodactylus doriæ, pp. 13–14 + Plate II, figure 4).
Rösler H (2000). "Kommemtierte Liste der rezent, subrezent und fossil bekannten Geckotaxa (Reptilia: Gekkonomorpha)". Gekkota 2: 28–153. (Stenodactylus doriae, p. 115). (in German).
Sindaco R, Jeremčenko VK (2008). The Reptiles of the Western Palearctic. 1. Annotated Checklist and Distributional Atlas of the Turtles, Crocodiles, Amphisbaenians and Lizards of Europe, North Africa, Middle East and Central Asia. (Monographs of the Societas Herpetologica Italica). Latina, Italy: Edizioni Belvedere. 580 pp. . 

doriae
Geckos of Iran
Reptiles described in 1874